There was no women's tournament held in the previous year. Rafaella Reggi was the champion in the 1985 edition. She lost in the second round to Arantxa Sánchez Vicario.

Steffi Graf won the title by defeating Gabriela Sabatini 7–5, 4–6, 6–0 in the final.

Seeds
The first eight seeds received a bye to the second round.

Draw

Finals

Top half

Section 1

Section 2

Bottom half

Section 3

Section 4

References

External links
 Official results archive (ITF)
 Official results archive (WTA)

1987 Italian Open (tennis)
Italian Open
Italian Open (Tennis), 1987
Italian Open